Ecclesiastes is a book of the Hebrew Bible. It may also refer to:
Ecclesiastes of Erasmus, or Ecclesiastes: On the Art of Preaching, by Desiderius Erasmus, published 1535
Ecclesiastes Rabbah, an aggadic commentary on Ecclesiastes, included in the collection of the Midrash Rabbah. 
"Ecclesiastes", a track on Stevie Wonder's Journey Through "The Secret Life of Plants" (1979 album).

Similar spellings
Eccles (disambiguation)
Ecclesia (disambiguation)
Ecclesiast, member of the Clergy 
Wisdom of Sirach (or Ecclesiasticus), apocryphal book of the Septuagint